Alfred Schmidtke was a German New Testament scholar. As a collaborator of Hermann von Soden he worked on Greek uncial codices of the New Testament. Schmidtke travelled investigating the libraries of the monasteries of Albania and Macedonia on von Soden's behalf. In 1903, after a "long stay" at Mount Athos he published a description of the monastic republic there. In 1907 he assisted in the publication of the Paris uncial, in 1911 his work on the manuscripts of the Jewish Christian Gospels was published. There is no further record of him after the outbreak of World War I.

Works
 Das Klosterland des Athos, 1903
 Die Evangelien eines alten Unzialcodex nach einer Abschrift des Dreizehnten Jahrunderts, 1903
 Neue Fragmente und Untersuchungen zu den judenchristlichen Evangelien, Leipzig 1911

References

German biblical scholars
20th-century German people
Year of birth missing
Year of death missing